Six Feet Under is an American comedy-drama series that aired on premium cable network HBO from June 3, 2001, to August 21, 2005. It has been nominated for many different awards, including 44 Emmy Awards (with 9 wins), 8 Golden Globe Award nominations (including 3 wins), 3 Grammy Awards, 4 Writers Guild of America Awards, 4 Television Critics Association Awards, 4 Screen Actors Guild Awards (including 3 wins), 4 Satellite Awards, 4 PGA Awards, 5 GLAAD Media Awards (with 3 wins), 5 Directors Guild of America Awards and 4 ALMA Award nominations.

For the Golden Globe Awards, the series won for Best Drama Series in 2001, while receiving nominations in 2002 and 2003. Peter Krause was nominated for Best Actor in a Drama Series in 2001 and 2002. Rachel Griffiths won for Best Supporting Actress in a Series, Miniseries, or TV Film in 2001, and received a nomination in 2002 in the Lead Actress category. Frances Conroy won for Best Actress in a Drama Series in 2003. For the Screen Actors Guild Awards, the cast won for Outstanding Ensemble in a Drama Series in 2002 and 2003, while received nominations in 2001, 2004, and 2005. Peter Krause was nominated for Outstanding Male Actor in a Drama Series in 2001 and 2003. Frances Conroy won for Outstanding Female Actor in a Drama Series in 2003.

The series received 11 major Emmy nominations for its first two seasons and received 9 major nominations for the 2003 Primetime Emmy Awards for its third season, including a nomination for Outstanding Drama Series. The series received 2 major nominations at the 2005 Primetime Emmy Awards for its fourth season, for Outstanding Drama Series and Outstanding Lead Actress in a Drama Series for Frances Conroy. The series received 6 major nominations at the 2006 Primetime Emmy Awards for its fifth and final season, including a nomination for Outstanding Drama Series. Alan Ball was nominated for writing and directing for the series finale episode "Everyone's Waiting". The show, during its run, was nominated for 168 awards including 46 wins.

Emmy Awards
At the 2002 Primetime Emmy Awards, the series received 11 major nominations for its two first seasons, including a nomination for Outstanding Drama Series. Series creator Alan Ball won for Outstanding Directing for a Drama Series for the pilot episode and Patricia Clarkson won for Outstanding Guest Actress in a Drama Series. The rest of the ensemble cast, including Michael C. Hall, Peter Krause, Frances Conroy, Rachel Griffiths, Freddy Rodriguez, and Lauren Ambrose all received acting nominations. While guest actors Lili Taylor and Illeana Douglas received nominations in the guest acting category.

The series received 9 major nominations at the 2003 Primetime Emmy Awards for its third season, including a nomination for Outstanding Drama Series. Peter Krause, Frances Conroy, Lauren Ambrose, Rachel Griffiths, James Cromwell, and Kathy Bates all received acting nominations. Alan Poul was nominated for directing for the episode "Nobody Sleeps", while Craig Wright was nominated for writing for the episode "Twilight". The series received 2 major nominations at the 2005 Primetime Emmy Awards for its fourth season, for Outstanding Drama Series and Outstanding Lead Actress in a Drama Series for Frances Conroy. The series received 6 major nominations at the 2006 Primetime Emmy Awards for its fifth and final season, including a nomination for Outstanding Drama Series. Patricia Clarkson won for the second time for Outstanding Guest Actress in a Drama Series. While Peter Krause, Frances Conroy, and Joanna Cassidy received acting nominations. Alan Ball was nominated for writing and directing for the series finale episode "Everyone's Waiting".

Primetime Emmy Awards

Creative Arts Emmy Awards

GLAAD Media Awards

Golden Globes

Grammy Awards

Screen Actors Guild Awards

Writers Guild of America Awards
The Writers Guild of America Awards are presented annually by the Writers Guild of America. Six Feet Under has been nominated for 4 Writers Guild of America Awards but has won none.

Other awards

References

External links
 
 

Awards
Six Feet Under